Revolution: New Art for a New World is a feature documentary written and directed by Margy Kinmonth and produced by Foxtrot Films Ltd and Arts Alliance, starring Matthew Macfadyen (Vladimir Lenin), Tom Hollander (Kazimir Malevich), Eleanor Tomlinson (Lyubov Popova), James Fleet (Wassily Kandinsky) and Daisy Bevan (Varvara Stepanova). The film documents the famous Russian Avant-garde artists that flourished after the October Revolution, only to be later suppressed by Joseph Stalin's regime. The documentary was filmed on location in London, Saint Petersburg and Moscow, with access to The Tretyakov Gallery, The Russian Museum, The Hermitage Museum and in co-operation with The Royal Academy of Arts, London.

Revolution: New Art for a New World was aired on BBC Four in October 2017 as part of the BBC's Russian Season to mark the centenary of the Russian Revolution.

Credits 
 Contributors
 Dr. Anne Applebaum 
 Professor Christina Lodder 
 Dr. Natalia Murray
 Evgenia Petrova 
 Professor Mikhail Piotrovsky 
 Zelfira Tregulova

References 

BBC television documentaries about history during the 20th Century
Documentary television series about art
2016 British television series debuts
2016 British  television series endings